This is the list of governors of the Brazilian state of Tocantins.

References

Footnotes

Tocantins
Governors of Tocantins